The chapters of Samurai Harem: Asu no Yoichi was written and illustrated by Yū Minamoto. It has been serialized in Monthly Shōnen Champion since it premiered in the October 2006 issue. The individual chapters are collected and published in tankōbon volumes by Akita Shoten, with the first volume published on October 6, 2006. Fifteen volumes were released in Japan. The manga is licensed and released in Chinese by Sharp Point Press. The manga is licensed in North America by Tokyopop as Samurai Harem: Asu no Yoichi!.



Volume listing

References

Samurai Harem: Asu no Yoichi